Ragh is a town in Badakhshan Province in north-eastern part of Afghanistan. It is the capital of Raghistan District.

Climate
Ragh has a warm-summer humid continental climate (Köppen Dsb) with mild, dry summers and cold, snowy winters.

See also
Badakhshan Province

References

External links
Satellite map at Maplandia.com

Populated places in Badakhshan Province